St Ives High School is a coeducational government high school located in St Ives, New South Wales on the Upper North Shore of Sydney, Australia. Approximately 1300 students are enrolled at the school each year.  The school has spacious grounds with a 2 small sports fields. Apart from the immediate local area of St Ives, the school's intake area extends through Hornsby to north of Mount Colah.

Brief history 
The building development of the school began in 1963. Prior to the development, the school had an enrolment of 150 students. Due to the incomplete construction, these students were transferred to Asquith Boys High School, Hornsby Girls' High School and Asquith Girls High School. They were segregated from the other students at their respective foster schools as they had their own uniform and classes. When the construction finally finished in 1964, students were able to start classes at their own school. However, the infrastructure of the school was still unfinished. The students and staff had neither electricity nor gas and the windows were unglazed.

As of 2018, the Australian government is planning to refurbish the school's art department and the construction of a new sport hall.

Notable alumni 
 Megan Connolly, actor
 Chris Foy, actor
 Frenzal Rhomb members Alexis 'Lex' Feltham and Jason Whalley
 Jane Jamieson, Olympic athlete
 Evelyn Juers, writer
 Jim Jefferies, Australian comedian
 Elli Overton, Olympic swimmer
 Candy Raymond, actor
 David Sinclair, biologist
 Emily Symons, actor
 Rich Thompson, Olympic baseball silver medallist
 John Walton, actor
 Jeannette Young, Governor of Queensland, former Chief Health Officer

References

External links 
 St Ives High School's website
 St Ives High School's webpage at NSW Department of Education and Training's website

Educational institutions established in 1964
Public high schools in Sydney
St Ives, New South Wales
1964 establishments in Australia